Michael Papps (20 July 1932 – 5 October 2022) was an Australian sports shooter. He competed at the 1960 Summer Olympics and the 1964 Summer Olympics. Papps died on 5 October 2022, at the age of 90.

References

1932 births
2022 deaths
Australian male sport shooters
Olympic shooters of Australia
Shooters at the 1960 Summer Olympics
Shooters at the 1964 Summer Olympics
Sportspeople from Adelaide
Shooters at the 1966 British Empire and Commonwealth Games
Commonwealth Games medallists in shooting
Commonwealth Games silver medallists for Australia
20th-century Australian people
Medallists at the 1966 British Empire and Commonwealth Games